Alma Dea Morani (1907–2001) was a plastic surgeon. She is widely accepted as being the first female plastic surgeon in the United States and was the first female member accepted into the American Society of Plastic and Reconstructive Surgeons.

Early life 
Alma Dea Morani was artistically gifted beginning at a young age. Growing up she was exposed to her father's work which was heavy in religious symbolism. Religious art containing icons and emblems was used to spread the religious messages and teachings at the time. Morani's father, Salvatore Morani, was a sculptor. He was most well known for sculpting surgeons' hands. Morani's love for art, inspired by her father's works, influenced her to pursue a career in plastic surgery. While in her mid-teens Morani was an active Girl Scout. Through Girl Scouts Morani learned skills that allowed her to assist and treat minor medical injuries. This experience furthered her interest in medicine.

Education 
Morani completed her undergraduate education at New York University (NYU) in 1928. She then went on to attend the Woman's Medical College of Pennsylvania (WMCP). Morani graduated with a medical degree from MWCP in 1931 and continued on to complete her residency there in 1935.

Career 
Morani was the first female resident at WMCP until 1935. She did not start practicing plastic surgery until 1938, at this time she was known for being the first female plastic surgeon in the United States. To further improve her skillset as a surgeon, Morani went on to attend the American College of Surgeons in 1941. After completing her work at the American College of Surgeons, Morani did her fellowship under a well-respected surgeon, Colonel J. Brown. Morani eventually returned to WMCP where she became involved in higher education. She began by giving lectures and worked her way up the ranks to become a full professor over a span of 27 years. Having maintained a strong passion in both surgery and art throughout the course of her life, Morani was successful in incorporating both into her lectures.

Morani was philanthropically and politically active. During World War II Morani raised funds to help keep clinic doors open in  Philippines, Taiwan, Russia, and the Balkans. In addition, she provided pro-bono care to those serving the country,  volunteering at Valley Forge Hospital performing reconstructive surgery on wounded soldiers. Politically, Morani was active in speaking out in favor of women's rights. Morani pushed for women to be able to enter the field of medicine as easily as men.

Achievement 
Morani was the first female member accepted into the American Society of Plastic and Reconstructive Surgeons.
In 1948, Morani founded The Hand Clinic at Women's Medical College Hospital where students were able to get hands-on experience with patients.

Morani also left a lasting impression on the art community. With her contribution of the Morani Gallery of Art, her work can be seen on display today.
A majority of Morani’s art was inspired by her work in medicine. This is why her Gallery is located inside her alma mater, which was later renamed, The Medical College of Pennsylvania. The Medical College of Pennsylvania is the country's only medical school with an art gallery.

Alma Dea Morani award 
The Alma Dea Morani M.D., Renaissance Women Award was created in her name in 2000 to honor women physicians or scientists who made compelling contributions apart from medicine, as well as, facilitating the practice and competency of medicine. The award is presented in the shape of a surgeons hand to represent both Morani and her father's passion for sculpting.

 2000: Alma Dea Morani M.D., FACS
 2001: Barbara Barlow M.D., FACS
 2002: Carola B. Eisenburg
 2003: Mary Ellen Avery M.D. 
 2004: Christine E. Haycock M.D., FACS
 2005: Audrey E. Evans M.D. 
 2006: Mary Guinan Ph.D., M.D.
 2007: Catherine D. DeAngelis M.D. MPH
 2008: Ellen R. Gritz Ph.D
 2009: Carol C. Nadelson M.D.
 2010: Marjorie S. Sirridge M.D.
 2011: Rita Charon M.D., Ph.D.
 2012: N. Lynn Eckhert M.D., MPH, DrPH
 2013: Florence P. Haseltine Ph.D., M.D.
 2014: Deborah German M.D.
 2015: Mary-Claire King Ph.D.
 2016: Paula Johnson M.D., MPH
 2017: Elizabeth Blackburn Ph.D., and Carol Greider Ph. D.

References 

1907 births
2001 deaths
20th-century American women physicians
20th-century American physicians
American plastic surgeons
New York University alumni
Woman's Medical College of Pennsylvania alumni
Women surgeons
20th-century surgeons
20th-century American people